Daniel F. Johnson (born January 29, 1801) was a Michigan politician.

Early life
Johnson was born on January 29, 1801, in Canton, New York (now named Cairo). In 1834, Johnson settled on a farm in Groveland Township, Michigan.

Career
In 1836, Johnson served as supervisor of Groveland Township. On November 4, 1839, Johnson was elected to the Michigan House of Representatives, where he represented the Oakland County district from January 6, 1840, to April 1, 1840. Johnson again served as supervisor of Groveland Township in 1851. In 1854, Johnson left the Whig Party and became a Republican.

References

1801 births
Year of death unknown
People from Oakland County, Michigan
Members of the Michigan House of Representatives
Michigan Republicans
Michigan Whigs
19th-century American politicians